Muhammad Danurwindo (born 15 May 1951 in Purworejo, Central Java) is a former Indonesian footballer and coach. He is now a technical director for the Indonesia national football team, whom he once coached.

Honours

Manager
Arseto Solo
 Piala Galatama: 1985
 Galatama-Perserikatan Invitational Championship: 1987
 Galatama: 1987

Pelita Jaya
 Galatama: 1988–89, 1990, 1993–94
 Piala Utama: 1992

References

1951 births
Living people
Indonesian footballers
Indonesia international footballers
Indonesian football managers
Indonesia national football team managers
Association footballers not categorized by position
Sportspeople from Central Java